Strings! is the second album by guitarist Pat Martino recorded in 1967 and released on the Prestige label.

Reception

AllMusic awarded the album 4 stars stating "Guitarist Pat Martino's second recording as a leader finds him essentially playing advanced bop. His quintet really roars on an uptempo version of "Minority" and is diverse enough to come up with meaningful statements on four of Martino's originals".

The authors of the Penguin Guide to Jazz Recordings commented that Strings! is "noteworthy for a long, burning treatment of Gigi Gryce's 'Minority', where Farrell's thunderous tenor solo is matched by equally flying statements by Martino and Walton."

Track listing 
All compositions by Pat Martino except as indicated
 "Strings" - 5:52  
 "Minority" (Gigi Gryce) - 9:20  
 "Lean Years" - 8:37  
 "Mom" - 7:23  
 "Querido" - 6:07

Personnel 
Pat Martino - guitar
Joe Farrell - tenor saxophone, flute
Cedar Walton - piano
Ben Tucker - bass
Walter Perkins - drums
Ray Appleton, Dave Levin - percussion (track 1)

Production
Don Schlitten - producer
Rudy Van Gelder - engineer

References 

Pat Martino albums
1967 albums
Prestige Records albums
Albums produced by Don Schlitten
Albums recorded at Van Gelder Studio